Nelson Fryer (February 22, 1818 – June 5, 1896) was an American farmer and politician.

Born in Princetown, Schenectady County, New York, Fryer moved to Cold Spring, Wisconsin Territory in 1843. Fryer was a farmer. He served on the Cold Spring Town Board and was chairman. He also served as town treasurer. In 1871, Fryer served in the Wisconsin State Assembly and was a Democrat.

Notes

External links

1818 births
1896 deaths
People from Schenectady County, New York
People from Jefferson County, Wisconsin
Farmers from Wisconsin
Wisconsin city council members
Mayors of places in Wisconsin
Democratic Party members of the Wisconsin State Assembly
19th-century American politicians